Alliance & Leicester International Limited (ALIL) was the international banking subsidiary of Alliance & Leicester, which was subsequently bought by the Santander Group in October 2008. 

The bank offered a range of international savings accounts primarily to Isle of Man residents and British expatriates, but also to non domiciles living in the United Kingdom, Channel Island residents and expatriates worldwide. ALIL's range of accounts included instant access, notice, monthly interest and fixed rate bonds in pound sterling, US dollars and euros.

In May 2010, Alliance & Leicester merged into Santander UK, which was formed by the combination of Santander's existing subsidiary Abbey, with the savings business of Bradford & Bingley. The business of Alliance & Leicester International transferred to Santander UK's Isle of Man branch on 7 May 2013.

History 
The bank was formed in 1990, and was based in the Isle of Man. ALIL was one of the largest deposit takers in the Isle of Man, with over £179 million in share capital and reserves. ALIL's eSaver accounts, which were launched in 2007, were the first international savings accounts to offer a purely online application process with no 'wet’ signature.

On 5 August 2011, the business of Bradford & Bingley International, which was also part of the Santander Group, was transferred to Alliance & Leicester International, ahead of the expiry of the trademark licence on the Bradford & Bingley name in September 2011. In March 2013, it was announced that the bank would transfer its business to Santander UK's Isle of Man branch. Customer accounts were transferred on 7 May 2013.

References

External links 

 

Offshore finance
Defunct banks of the Isle of Man
Banks established in 1990
Banks disestablished in 2013
Banco Santander
British companies disestablished in 2013 
British companies established in 1990 
1990 establishments in the Isle of Man
1990 establishments in England
2013 disestablishments in the Isle of Man
2013 disestablishments in England